Kuei-Mei, a Woman is a 1985 Taiwanese drama film directed by Chang Yi. The film was selected as the Taiwanese entry for the Best Foreign Language Film at the 58th Academy Awards, but was not accepted as a nominee. It won the Golden Horse Award for Best Feature Film in 1985.

Cast
 Hui San Yang as Kuei-Mei
 Lichun Lee as Kuei-Mei's husband

See also
 List of submissions to the 55th Academy Awards for Best Foreign Language Film
 List of Taiwanese submissions for the Academy Award for Best Foreign Language Film

References

External links
 

1985 films
1985 drama films
1980s Mandarin-language films
Central Motion Picture Corporation films
Taiwanese drama films